Trudovoy is a rural locality (a settlement) in Trudovoy Selsoviet of Oktyabrsky District, Amur Oblast, Russia. The population was 105 as of 2018. There are 11 streets.

Geography 
Trudovoy is located 57 km southwest of Yekaterinoslavka (the district's administrative centre) by road. Zaozyorny is the nearest rural locality.

References 

Rural localities in Oktyabrsky District, Amur Oblast